René Desmaison (April 14, 1930, in Bourdeilles, Dordogne – September 28, 2007) was a veteran French mountaineer, climber and alpinist.

Desmaison had climbed more than 1,000 mountains since the 1950s. He made the first ascent of 114 previously unclimbed mountains throughout the Andes, Alps and Himalayas in his 40-year climbing career. He is also credited with creating several new winter routes in the Alps.

René Desmaison died on September 28, 2007, at La Timone Hospital in Marseille, France. He was 77 years old.

References

External links
 

1930 births
2007 deaths
Sportspeople from Dordogne
French mountain climbers
Place of birth missing